Thomas James Gray (born January 6, 1945) is a retired American speed skater who specialized in the 500-meter sprint. In this event he finished in 14th and 21st place at the 1964 and 1968 Winter Olympics, respectively. He won this distance at the 1966 world championships and finished second in 1967. He attended the University of Minnesota and in the late 1960s served in the US Air Force. 

Personal bests:
500 m – 39.5 (1964)
1000 m – 1:26.0 (1968)
1500 m – 2:13.1 (1964)
5000 m – 9:09.0 (1972)
10000 m – 19:23.0 (1972)

References

External links 
 

1945 births
Living people
American male speed skaters
Olympic speed skaters of the United States
Speed skaters at the 1964 Winter Olympics
Speed skaters at the 1968 Winter Olympics